MMFA can stand for:

The Montreal Museum of Fine Arts
Media Matters for America, a media-watchdog organization